Stade de la Vallée du Cher is a multi-use stadium in Tours, France.  It is currently used mostly for football matches and is the home stadium of Tours FC. The stadium is able to hold 16,247 people and was built in 1978.

External links
 La Vallée du Cher on Tours FC official site

Vallee du Cher
Vallee du Cher
Buildings and structures in Tours, France
Sports venues in Indre-et-Loire
Sports venues completed in 1978
1978 establishments in France